Beau Champion (born 23 December 1986) is an Australian former professional rugby league footballer. He played for the South Sydney Rabbitohs, Melbourne Storm, Gold Coast Titans and Parramatta Eels in the National Rugby League. He is the second cousin of teammate Greg Inglis. Champion's preferred playing position is at  after being groomed as a halfback in his debut year. Champion has represented City in the 2010 City v Country Origin as well as making the 2010 Indigenous All-Stars Squad.

Early career
Champion is a South Sydney Junior who played for the South Eastern Seagulls and La Perouse Panthers.

Senior career

2005-2010
Champion made his NRL Debut round 18 of the 2005 NRL Season in a 24–14 win over the Cronulla Sharks at the Sydney Football Stadium.

He finished his debut season playing 8 games and kicking 3 goals.

During Champion's first stint at South Sydney, he played 70 games scoring 33 tries and kicking 5 goals.

On 8 November 2011, it was revealed that Champion's cousin Greg Inglis would most likely sign with South Sydney. Champion, along with Souths owner and Australian actor Russell Crowe, Inglis's close friend Anthony Mundine and billionaire Andrew Forrest, were influences for Inglis's shock move to Redfern.

2011
When it was officially announced that Greg Inglis would be moving to Souths, it was Champion who had to make way due to salary cap pressure. On 24 December 2010, Champion signed a 3-year deal with Melbourne, ironically replacing and inheriting the position of his cousin Greg Inglis.

Champion played 16 games with the Melbourne Storm scoring 8 tries.

2012
On 13 May 2011, Champion signed with the Gold Coast Titans, meaning that the 2011 NRL season would not only be his first season with the Melbourne Storm, but it would also be his last. He played his last game with Melbourne in their preliminary final loss to the New Zealand Warriors with Champion scoring a try in the game.

Champion had an injury-plagued 2012 with the Gold Coast Titans only playing in 9 matches scoring 4 tries.

2013-2014
On 8 January 2013, the South Sydney Rabbitohs announced that Champion would be returning home to Redfern on a 2-year deal covering the 2013–2014 seasons. The Gold Coast Titans released Champion from the final two years of his contract to facilitate this. Titans coach John Cartwright was very supportive of Champion's decision to return to NSW saying "I think most people agree that you play your best football where you are happy and after sitting down and talking with Beau about this opportunity to go back to Souths, we fully understand his reasons why. His home is Redfern and he wanted to go so we wish him all the best for the future."

2015

On 26 August 2014, it was announced that Champion had signed a one-year deal with the Parramatta Eels for the 2015 NRL season.

On 19 August 2015, Champion announced his retirement from rugby league after failing to recover from an Anterior cruciate ligament injury sustained during the Round 2 match against the Canterbury-Bankstown Bulldogs.

References

External links
South Sydney 2010 Squad
South Sydney Squad 2008

1986 births
Living people
Australian rugby league players
Indigenous Australian rugby league players
South Sydney Rabbitohs players
Gold Coast Titans players
Melbourne Storm players
Parramatta Eels players
North Sydney Bears NSW Cup players
New South Wales City Origin rugby league team players
Indigenous All Stars players
Rugby league centres
Rugby league players from Sydney
People educated at Endeavour Sports High School